Ioannis Milonas (alternate spelling: Giannis) (born July 27, 1969 in Trikala, Greece) is a retired Greek professional basketball player. At a height of 2.02 m (6' 7"), he played at the small forward position.

Professional career
Milonas began playing basketball with Danaos Trikallon. In his pro career, he then played with Peristeri from 1989 to 1997. He also played with Apollon Patras (1997–98), Dafni (1999–00), and Faros Keratsini (2005–07).

National team career
Milonas was a member of the senior men's Greek national basketball team. With Greece's senior national team, he played at EuroBasket 1991. He was also a member of the Greek national team that finished in 4th place at the 1994 FIBA World Championship.

External links 
FIBA.com Profile
FIBA Europe Profile
Hellenic Federation Profile 

1969 births
Living people
Apollon Patras B.C. players
Dafnis B.C. players
Faros Keratsiniou B.C. players
Greek men's basketball players
Greek Basket League players
Peristeri B.C. players
Small forwards
Basketball players from Trikala
Mediterranean Games medalists in basketball
Mediterranean Games silver medalists for Greece
Competitors at the 1991 Mediterranean Games
1994 FIBA World Championship players